Anna Marta Jesień, née Olichwierczuk (born 10 December 1978 in Kostki near Sokołów Podlaski) is a Polish former hurdler.

She won the bronze medal in the 400 m hurdles at the 2002 European Athletics Championships in Munich. Four years later she finished 6th in the final of the same event at the 2006 European Athletics Championships in Gothenburg.

She also competed in both 2000 Olympic Games and the 2004 Olympic Games but failed to make it through the heats on both occasions. She finished 4th in the 2005 World Championships. In 2007, she won the bronze medal at World Championships in Osaka.

At the 2008 Olympics, she reached the final of the 400 m hurdles and finished in 5th place, while the women's 4 x 400 metre team reached the semi-finals.  At the 2012 Olympics, she reached the semi-finals in the 400 m hurdles.

Competition record

See also
 Polish records in athletics

References

External links
 

1978 births
Polish female hurdlers
Athletes (track and field) at the 2000 Summer Olympics
Athletes (track and field) at the 2004 Summer Olympics
Athletes (track and field) at the 2008 Summer Olympics
Athletes (track and field) at the 2012 Summer Olympics
Olympic athletes of Poland
Living people
World Athletics Championships medalists
People from Sokółka County
European Athletics Championships medalists
Sportspeople from Podlaskie Voivodeship
Skra Warszawa athletes